Joachim Christoph Schmillen (born December 6, 1962 in Prüm, Germany) is a German diplomat and has been the current German Ambassador to Peru since September 2011.

Career
In 1983 Schmillen joined the German military as an officer candidate. From 1984 to 1988 he studied education and psychology (Diplom) at Bundeswehr University Munich. After finishing his studies Schmillen left the military and used to work for the members of the German Bundestag Alfred Mechtersheiner and later Vera Lengsfeld.

From 1991 to 1994 he used to work as scientific foreign and security policy coordinator of the Alliance '90/The Greens parliamentary group in the Bundestag. From 1994 to 1998 he was head of office and personal assistant to the chief of the parliamentary group in the German parliament, Joschka Fischer. When the later was appointed foreign minister in 1998, Schmillen joined the German Foreign Ministry, again as Fischer's personal assistant and head of his office. From 2002 to 2003 he served as head of the policy planning staff of the foreign ministry. In 2003 he was appointed German Ambassador to Chile, in 2006 German Ambassador to Nigeria, and in 2011 to Peru.

Publications
 Achim Schmillen: Das Fenster zum Angriff, die Entwicklung der Golfkrise: Kurzanalyse und Dokumentation. Wuppertal 1991.
 Achim Schmillen: Rüstungsplanung 1995 Mit „Krisenreaktionskräften“ gegen den neuen „Feind“. In W&F Wissenschaft und Frieden, 3/94, Münster 1994.

References

External links
 Ambassador's profile on the German Embassy's website

1962 births
Living people
Ambassadors of Germany to Chile
Ambassadors of Germany to Nigeria
Ambassadors of Germany to Peru
Bundeswehr University Munich alumni